Małuszów may refer to the following places in Poland:
Małuszów, Jawor County in Lower Silesian Voivodeship (south-west Poland)
Małuszów, Wrocław County in Lower Silesian Voivodeship (south-west Poland)
Małuszów, Lubusz Voivodeship (west Poland)